At the 2004 Commonwealth Youth Games, the athletics events were held at the La Trobe University Athletics Complex in Bendigo, Australia from 2–3 December. A total of 34 events were contested, divided equally between the sexes. Among the medallists on the girls' side were Dani Samuels (the 2009 discus world champion) and two 2012 Olympic champions, Sally McLellan (100 m hurdles) and Jessica Ennis (heptathlon).

Medal summary

Boys

Girls

References

Results
 

2004
Commonwealth Youth Games
2004 Commonwealth Youth Games
2004 in youth sport